The men's canoe sprint K-2 200 metres competition at the 2012 Olympic Games in London took place between 10 and 11 August at Eton Dorney.

Yury Postrigay and Alexander Dyachenko, representing Russia, won the gold medal. Raman Piatrushenka and Vadzim Makhneu from Belarus won silver and Great Britain's Liam Heath and Jon Schofield took bronze.

Format

The competition comprised heats, semifinals, and a final round.  Heat winners advanced to the "A" final, with all other boats getting a second chance in the semifinals.  The top three from each semifinal also advanced to the "A" final, and competed for medals.  A placing "B" final was held for the other semifinalists.

Schedule

All times are British Summer Time (UTC+01:00)

Results

Heats
The five best placed boat from each heat qualified for the semifinals, remainder went to the "B" final.

Heat 1

Heat 2

Semifinals
First four boats in each semifinal qualify for the "A" final, remainder go to the "B" final.

Semifinal 1

Semifinal 2

Finals

Final B

Final A

References

Canoeing at the 2012 Summer Olympics
Men's events at the 2012 Summer Olympics